John McCarty may be:

Politicians 
John McCarty (born 1782), New York state senator
John McCarty (born 1844), New York state senator

Sports 
John McCarty (baseball), baseball pitcher, 1867-1942

See also
 John McCarthy (disambiguation)